Pumpkin Glacier is a glacier in Glacier National Park in the U.S. state of Montana. It is northeast of Blackfoot Mountain and adjacent to Pumpelly Glacier, the two glaciers separated by crevasses. Pumpkin Glacier is immediately west of the Continental Divide. Pumpkin and Pumpelly Glaciers covered  as of 2005, a 15 percent reduction in area since 1966.

References

See also
 List of glaciers in the United States
 Glaciers in Glacier National Park (U.S.)

Glaciers of Flathead County, Montana
Glaciers of Glacier National Park (U.S.)
Glaciers of Montana